Bashundhara Kings is a professional football team based in Bashundhara Residential Area, Dhaka, Bangladesh. They clinched the title of the 2017 Bangladesh Championship League, the second tier of the professional football league, in their maiden appearance. The club currently competes in the Bangladesh Premier League, the top flight of Bangladeshi Football. Founded in 2013, the club debuted in Bangladesh Premier League during the 2018–19 season. The club is owned and managed by Bashundhara Group.

History

Inception
The club started their football journey with 2016 DCC (N&S) Pioneer League, where they finished the league at 3rd position. The club were promoted to Third Division Football League but they decided to play Bangladesh Championship League, which is the second-tier league of the country, by fulfilling  all the conditions to participate. In March 2017, the club got green signal from Bangladesh Football Federation to participate.

On 13 May 2017 the club completed their player registration for 2017 Bangladesh Championship League. Former national team striker Rokonuzzaman Kanchan was named as captain for the season by the club officials.

2017–18 season
Bashundhara Kings played their first official match against Uttar Baridhara SC on 7 August 2017 during 2017 Bangladesh Championship League. Ripon Biswas scored the first-ever goal for the club in same match.

On 18 August 2017 the club tasted their maiden victory in the league where they beat NoFeL Sporting Club by 1–0 goal. Captain Rokonuzzaman Kanchan scored the winning goal for his club.

On 4 November 2017, Kings confirm their participation at Premier League as they clinch the title of 2017 Bangladesh Championship League after a dramatic 2–1 victory over Agrani Bank with one match remaining.

They even had the luxury of fielding the club's president-cum-player Md Imrul Hassan as a striker for a few minutes before the final whistle. Imrul, who did not play in any of the previous matches, did not get to touch the ball, but was nevertheless happy to indulge in the winning feeling with his players.

Veteran striker Kanchan scored 11 goals for the club and was the second-top scorer of the tournament after Ariful Islam scored 12 goals for NoFeL Sporting Club. On 11 November 2017, Bangladesh Football Federation handed over the champion trophy to the club which is the first-ever domestic trophy for the club.

2018–19 season
On 29 July 2018, Bashundhara Kings officially started their player transfer formalities for upcoming 2018–19 season as they inked the contract papers with forward Tawhidul Alam Sabuz, defender Nurul Nayeem Faisal and midfielder Mohammad Ibrahim during the signing ceremony.
On 5 September 2018, the club officially announced the name of Spaniard Oscar Bruzon as their new head coach for upcoming season. He is also the first-ever foreign coach appointed by the club. On 16 September 2018, Bashundhara Kings formally inked the deal with Costa Rican forward Daniel Colindres for 2018–19 season. Colindres was part of the 23-man Costa Rica squad for the 2018 FIFA World Cup.
On 21 September 2018, Kings played their first-ever home match at Sheikh Kamal Stadium against New Radiant SC from Maldives during a friendly match. The Kings completely obliterated their opponent by 4–1 goals where Haitian forward Kervens Belfort, Gambian forward Ousman Jallow and local forwards Tawhidul Alam Sabuz and Mahbubur Rahman Sufil scored one goal apiece in this international club friendly.

On 13 October, the club completed their player registration for upcoming season. The club submitted a list of 32 registered players to BFF, including three foreign footballers.

On 29 October 2018, The Kings started their 2018 Bangladesh Federation Cup journey as they beat falling giant Dhaka Mohammedan 5–2, thanks largely down to Colindres’ brilliant performance. World Cupper Daniel Colindres was on fire again as his treble powered his team into the semifinals of the tournament with an imposing 5–1 win over Team BJMC in the last quarterfinal. In the semifinal, Tawhidul Alam Sabuz came on from the bench in the 70th minute, scoring the winning goal in the extra time to make it 1–0 against Sheikh Russel KC and carried the Kings to the final. But they lost the final 3–1 to Dhaka Abahani on 23 November.

On 2 December 2018, Bashundhara Kings kicked off their 2018 Independence Cup campaign with a dominant 2–0 win over Sheikh Jamal Dhanmondi Club. On 14 December 2018, Goalkeeper Anisur Rahman Zico's heroic performance in shootout after Costa Rican Daniel Colindres' shining display helped Kings edge a spirited Rahmatganj MFS 3–2 in tiebreak in the fourth quarterfinal of the tournament. On 20 December 2018, Another heroic performance by goalkeeper Anisur Rahman Zico propelled Bashundhara Kings to the Independence Cup final with a 7–6 win on penalties over Dhaka Abahani.
On 26 December 2018, Bashundhara Kings laid their hands on their first silverware in top-flight football with a 2–1 win against former champions Sheikh Russel KC in an entertaining final of the Walton Independence Cup, thanks to an extra-time goal from substitute forward Motin Mia after Marcos Vinicius's early strike was cancelled out by Sheikh Russel's Raphael Odovin in the stoppage time of the first half.

On 19 January 2019, Kings won their debut encounter of the league by prevailing over Sheikh Jamal Dhanmondi Club by 1-0 goal. Marcos Vinicius scored the lone goal of the match to help Kings triumph. On 23 January 2019, Bashundhara Kings made a dream debut in their home ground Sheikh Kamal Stadium as they beat defending champions Dhaka Abahani by 3-0 margin.

On 29 April 2019, it was confirmed that Trinidadian forward Willis Plaza is set to join the club on a loan move from Churchill Brothers S.C. for the second leg of Bangladesh Football Premier League. On 7 July 2019, Bashundhara Kings beat Team BJMC 2–0 at Sheikh Kamal Stadium in Nilphamari on Sunday afternoon to further bolster their position at the top of the BPL table. It was Bashundhara Kings’ 12th straight victory of the season—the longest winning streak in the history of BPL.

On 25 July 2019, Bashundhara Kings have clinched the title of Bangladesh Premier League 2018–2019 season creating history by claiming the title in their maiden appearance with their 1-1 goal draw against Mohammedan Sporting Club Ltd at Sheikh Kamal Stadium in Nilphamari on Thursday. The star-studded Bashundhara Kings emerged new champions with two matches to spare. Bashundhara Kings became the first team to claim the title in their maiden run in the league since the introduction of the professional league in the nation.
This is the second major soccer trophy for Bashundhara Kings in the season after the Independence Cup Football after finishing runners-up in the season's curtain raiser meet—Federation Cup Football. On 3 August 2019, Bashundhara Kings concluded their memorable debut season in the Bangladesh Premier League with a 1–1 draw against Chittagong Abahani Limited. In what was a dominant league performance throughout the season, the Kings lost only once, against Sheikh Russel Krira Chakra, and finished with 63 points from 24 matches.

2019–20 season
On 7 November 2019, it was revealed that Kings signed Bangladesh-origin Finland right-back Tariq Kazi to bolster their defense for the upcoming season. On 2 February 2020, former Argentina international Hernan Barcos will be signed for Bangladesh Premier League champions Bashundhara Kings in their upcoming AFC Cup campaign and the second phase of the league, confirmed club president Imrul Hassan.

On 11 March 2020, Argentine striker Hernan Barcos made a remarkable debut in Bangladesh with a sensational quadruple as Bashundhara Kings kicked off their maiden 2020 AFC Cup campaign from Group E with a dominating 5–1 win over TC Sports Club. Barcos, who featured for Argentina four times, headed his first two goals within half an hour before netting two more after the break, while skipper Daniel Colindres added the other to record Bashundhara's biggest win of the season. It was arguably the best performance of the season from the Kings whose goalkeeper Anisur Rahman Zico also starred in between the posts by making three penalty saves, one of which was scored on the rebound during Easa Ismail's equalizer, while the other was retaken and saved again with a dive to his left.

On 17 May 2020, The BFF executive committee, following an emergency meeting, declared the 12th edition of the league abandoned, scrapping promotion and relegation while canceling the Independence Cup from the calendar as a precaution to combat the spread of coronavirus in the country. On 10 June 2020, Bashundhra Kings released their Costa Rican World-Cupper Daniel Colindres after a nearly two-year stint with the club. On 5 August 2020, Bashundhara Kings announced their new signing Robson Robinho for the AFC Cup and forthcoming football season as the Brazilian winger is all set to join the Bangladesh side on loan from Fluminense FC for a year. On 21 August 2020, Midfielder Jonathan Fernandes, who last played for Brazilian top-tier outfit Botafogo, joined the club.

On 10 September 2020, Kings' journey in their debut AFC Cup campaign ended after just a single match. Kings took pole position in Group E with a 5-1 thrashing of TC Sports of Maldives in their opening fixture on 11 March, but the Bangladesh giants' campaign stalled when coronavirus spread throughout the continent, forcing the AFC to reschedule the remaining group matches at centralised venues before its cancellation.

2020–21 season
On 19 September 2020, Kings sealed an agreement with Iranian defender Khaled Shafiei as the club's fourth and last foreign recruit for the 2020–21 season.
On 31 October 2020,  Kings roped in Argentine-born Chilean footballer Raúl Becerra as its fourth foreigner. Raul will play in the place of his compatriot Hernan Barcos who left the club after the 10-month-contract expiry in October.

On 22 December 2020, Bashundhara Kings kicked off the domestic season with a comfortable 3–0 win over Rahmatganj MFS in the inaugural game of 2020–21 Federation Cup. On 10 January 2021, Kings retained the title of Federation Cup for successive time as they beat Saif Sporting Club by 1-0 margin in the 32nd edition final. Raúl Becerra netted the match-winner in the 52nd minute as the Kings bagged their first trophy in the new season. This was the fifth goal in five matches for Becerra, moving him to the joint top of the list with Saif forward Kenneth Ikechukwu.

On 13 January 2021, Defending Champions Kings kicked off the Bangladesh Premier League with a comfortable 2–0 victory over Uttar Baridhara Club. On 9 August 2021, Defending champions Bashundhara Kings retained the title of Bangladesh Premier League after handing a 2-0 defeat to three-time champions Sheikh Jamal Dhanmondi Club.

2021–22 season

Shirt sponsors

Home venue

From 2018–2021, the 20,000-plus-capacity Sheikh Kamal Stadium was the home ground of Bashundhara Kings. It is situated at Nilphamari District.
In 2020, Kings’ home venue, Sheikh Kamal Stadium in Nilphamari, had taken a brand new look as the whole stadium has dawned Bashundhara Kings themed colors.

Bashundhara Kings Arena
In 2019, it was confirmed that the Bashundhara Kings Arena will be the next destination for Kings. In the North Zone of the Bashundhara Sports Complex, there will be a football facility with a state-of-the-art natural grass playground of FIFA standard. Complemented with international standard dressing room facilities for both home and away team and match officials, 14,000 capacity gallery, VIP boxes, press conference, press box for proper broadcasting requirements and with broadcast-quality lighting of international standard.

From, 2021–22 Bangladesh Premier League, Bashundhara Kings started using Bashundhara Kings Arena as their home venue. On 17 February 2022, Bashundhara Kings played against Bangladesh Police FC, during the first ever match hosted by the Bashundhara Kings Arena, where Bashundhara Kings won 3–0 against Bangladesh Police FC.

International club friendly 
 On 21 September 2018, Kings played their first-ever home match at Sheikh Kamal Stadium against New Radiant SC in an international friendly match.

Current squad

Bashundhara Kings Squad for 2022–23 season.

Out on loan

Current technical staff

Team records

Overview

Head coaches' record

Continental record

Honours

League
 Bangladesh Premier League
  Winners (3): 2018–19, 2020–21, 2021–22
 Bangladesh Championship League
 Winners (1): 2017–18

Cup
 Bangladesh Federation Cup
  Winners (2): 2019–20, 2020–21
 Independence Cup
  Winners (2): 2018–19, 2022–23

Performance in AFC competitions

 AFC Cup: 2 Appearances
 2020: Cancelled
 2021: Group stage
 2022: Group stage

Notable players
The players below had senior international cap(s) for their respective countries. Players whose name is listed, represented their countries before or after playing for Bashundhara Kings.

Asia
 Bakhtiyar Duyshobekov (2018–20)
 Akhtam Nazarov (2019–20)
 Jalal Kdouh (2019–20)
 Reza Khanzadeh (2022–)

Africa
 Nuha Marong (2022)
Europe
 Stojan Vranješ (2021–22)

North America
 Daniel Colindres (2018–20)

South America
 Hernán Barcos (2020)

AFC club ranking

See also

References

External links
 Bashundhara Kings official site

Bashundhara Kings
Association football clubs established in 2013
Football clubs in Bangladesh
Sport in Bangladesh
Dhaka
2013 establishments in Bangladesh